In Qatar, the Constitution, as well as certain laws, provide for freedom of association, public assembly, and worship in accordance with the requirements of public order and morality. Notwithstanding this, the law prohibits proselytizing by non-Muslims and places some restrictions on public worship. Islam is the state religion.

Religious demography

The population is predominantly Sunni. The majority of noncitizens are from South and Southeast Asian and Arab countries working on temporary employment contracts, accompanied by family members in some cases. Most noncitizens are Shi'a or Sunni Muslims, Christians, Hindus, Buddhists, or Baháʼís. Most foreign workers and their families live near the major employment centers of Doha, Al Khor, Mesaieed, and Dukhan.

While the Government does not release demographic figures regarding religious affiliation, some membership figures are available from Christian community groups. Accordingly, the Christian community includes Catholics (80,000), Eastern and Greek Orthodox, Anglicans (10,000), Copts (3,000), and other Protestants. The Hindu community is almost exclusively Indian, while Buddhists include South, Southeast, and East Asians. Most Baháʼís come from Iran.

No foreign missionary groups operate openly in the country.

Status of religious freedom

Legal and policy framework
The Constitution, as well as certain laws, provide for freedom of association, public assembly, and worship in accordance with the requirements of public order and morality. However, the law prohibits proselytizing by non-Muslims and places some restrictions on public worship. The state religion is Islam. While most Qataris are Sunni, Shi'a Muslims freely practice their faith. The nationality law does not impose any restrictions on religious identity.

The Government and ruling family are linked inextricably to Islam. Non-Muslims, however, serve in government posts. The Ministry of Islamic Affairs controls the construction of mosques, clerical affairs, and Islamic education for adults and new converts. The emir participates in public prayers during both Eid holiday periods and personally finances the Hajj for citizens and noncitizens pilgrims who cannot afford to travel to Mecca.

Religious groups must register with the Government for legal recognition. The Government has granted legal status to Catholic, Anglican, Greek and other Eastern Orthodox, Coptic, and Indian Christian churches. It maintains an official register of approved religious groups. To be recognized, each group must have at least 1,500 members in the country. While evangelical congregations are not legally recognized because they individually lack the required membership, they worship freely and are provided physical security for their celebrations by the Ministry of Interior when required.

Both Muslims and non-Muslims are tried under the unified court system, incorporating both secular law and Shari'a (Islamic law). Convicted Muslims may earn a sentence reduction of a few months by memorizing the Qur'an. Litigants in civil cases may request the Shari'a courts to assume jurisdiction. In 2005 a panel was established in the courts for the Shi'a. The panel decides cases regarding marriage, divorce, inheritance, and other domestic matters. In matters involving religious issues, the new Family Law applies, which is not restricted to one branch of Islam.

Islamic instruction is compulsory for Muslims in state-sponsored schools. While there were no restrictions on non-Muslims providing private religious instruction for children, most foreign children attended secular private schools. Muslim children were allowed to go to secular and coeducational private schools.

The Government regulates the publication, importation, and distribution of all religious books and materials. However, in practice, individuals and religious institutions were not prevented from importing holy books and other religious items for personal or congregational use.

The Islamic holy days of Eid al-Fitr and Eid al-Adha are national holidays.

Restrictions on religious freedom
Government policy and practice contributed to the generally free practice of religion, although there were some restrictions.

Converting to another religion from Islam is considered apostasy and is technically a capital offense; however, since the country gained independence in 1971, there has been no recorded execution or other punishment for such an act.

The Government regulates the publication, importation, and distribution of non-Islamic religious literature. Individuals and religious institutions are allowed to import Bibles and other religious items for personal or congregational use. Christian religious literature, with the exception of Bibles, is readily available in English in local bookstores. In addition, religious materials for use at Christmas and Easter are readily available in local shops. A ship run by a Christian group docked in Doha for one week during the reporting period to sell books, including books on Christianity.

Religious services were held without prior authorization from the Government; however, congregations have been asked not to advertise them in advance or use visible religious symbols such as outdoor crosses. Christian services are regularly held and open to the public. Some services, particularly those on Easter and Christmas, drew more than 1,000 worshippers.

Christian clergy reported no problems wearing traditional religious clothing in public. While disclosure of religious affiliation is required when applying for a passport or other identity documents, affiliation is not reflected in the issued documents.

Hindus, Buddhists, Baháʼís, and members of other religious groups do not operate as freely as Christian congregations; however, they did not seek official recognition from the Government during the reporting period. Even so, there was no official effort to harass or hamper adherents of these groups in the private practice of their religion.

According to the Criminal Code, individuals caught proselytizing on behalf of an organization, society, or foundation, for any religion other than Islam, may be sentenced to a prison term of up to 10 years. Proselytizing on behalf of an individual for any religion other than Islam can result in a sentence of up to 5 years. Individuals who possess written or recorded materials or items that support or promote missionary activity can be imprisoned for up to two years.

While discrimination against expatriates in the areas of employment, education, housing, and health services occurred, nationality was usually the determinant rather than religion.

There were no reports of religious prisoners or detainees in the country.

Forced religious conversion
There were no reports of forced religious conversion, including of minor U.S. citizens who had been abducted or illegally removed from the United States, or of the refusal to allow such citizens to be returned to the United States.

Changes and developments in religious freedom

The Amir and other top government officials strongly supported the construction and establishment of churches. The Government assigned a coordinator in the Ministry of Foreign Affairs to speed up and facilitate the process, although some restrictions have been imposed on the use of certain religious symbols on buildings.

In May 2005, representatives of Christian churches in the country signed an agreement with the Government for a 50-year lease on land near Doha, where they intend to erect 6 churches. The leases will be nominal. Ground-breaking on the first church began in April 2006. It and three others are expected to be completed in 2008. A board composed of members of all the Christian churches was formed to liaise directly with the Ministry of Foreign Affairs regarding church matters. Previous barriers stemming from religious and cultural sensitivities were eased, and church representatives can now approach any government agency directly to conduct their religious affairs.

The Government granted each church permission to apply for visas for visiting clerics to preside over, and assist in, church services. There were no restrictions on religious ceremonies. Plans for large events were reported to the Ministry of Foreign Affairs, which in turn requested the Ministry of Interior to provide appropriate physical security measures.

The Fifth Conference of Inter-Faith Dialogue took place in Doha, May 7–9, 2007. Christian, Muslim and Jewish representatives were invited. Invitations were extended to the Catholic, Anglican, Coptic and other Orthodox denominations, as well as the Middle East Churches Council and Jewish rabbis, among others. Rabbis from the United States and other countries participated. During the conference, the Government announced the establishment of the "Doha International Center for Inter-Faith Dialogue," which will be based in the country. The center will be financed by the Government but will function as an independent entity. Its purpose will be to follow up on conference resolutions, papers, and studies, and engage local and international research centers and universities.

See also
Religion in Qatar
Human rights in Qatar

References
 United States Bureau of Democracy, Human Rights and Labor. Qatar: International Religious Freedom Report 2007. This article incorporates text from this source, which is in the public domain.

Qatar
Human rights in Qatar
Religion in Qatar